There are two stadiums in Peru named Estadio Miguel Grau.

 Estadio Miguel Grau (Piura) in Piura
 Estadio Miguel Grau (Callao) in Callao